Emery Bayisenge (born 28 March 1994) is a Rwandan international footballer who plays as a central defender for Bangladesh Premier League side Saif Sporting Club.

Club career
Born in Huye, Bayisenge has played club football for Amagaju, Isonga, APR, KAC Kénitra, JS Massira and USM Alger. In January 2019 he signed for Bangladeshi club Saif. He returned to Rwanda with AS Kigali in 2020.

He rejoined Saif in November 2021.

International career
He made his senior international debut for Rwanda in 2011, and has appeared in FIFA World Cup qualifying matches.

International goals
Scores and results list Rwanda's goal tally first.

References

1994 births
Living people
People from Huye District
Rwandan footballers
Rwanda international footballers
Amagaju F.C. players
Isonga F.C. players
APR F.C. players
KAC Kénitra players
JS Massira players
USM Alger players
Saif SC players
AS Kigali FC players
Botola players
Association football defenders
Rwandan expatriate footballers
Rwandan expatriate sportspeople in Morocco
Expatriate footballers in Morocco
Rwandan expatriate sportspeople in Algeria
Expatriate footballers in Algeria
Rwandan expatriates in Bangladesh
Expatriate footballers in Bangladesh
2016 African Nations Championship players
Rwanda A' international footballers
2020 African Nations Championship players